Središte may refer to:

 Središte monastery, a monastery in Serbia
 Malo Središte, a village in Serbia
 Veliko Središte, a village in Serbia